Waikōloa Village is a census-designated place (CDP) in Hawaii County, Hawaii, United States. The population was 6,362 at the 2010 census, up from 4,806 at the 2000 census. The name Waikoloa is used by the local post office.

Geography
Waikōloa Village is located on the west side of the island of Hawaii at  (19.941445, −155.792655). It is bordered to the west by Puako. Hawaii Route 19 forms the border between the two communities; it leads northeast  to Waimea and southwest  to Kailua-Kona.

Demographics

As of the census of 2000, there were 4,806 people, 1,750 households, and 1,225 families residing in the CDP. The racial makeup of the CDP was 45.92% White, 0.48% African American, 0.21% Native American, 16.65% Asian, 9.20% Pacific Islander, 1.46% from other races, and 26.09% from two or more races. Hispanic or Latino of any race were 8.99% of the population.

There were 1,750 households, out of which 41.2% had children under the age of 18 living with them, 51.5% were married couples living together, 13.0% had a female householder with no husband present, and 30.0% were non-families. 19.7% of all households were made up of individuals, and 3.6% had someone living alone who was 65 years of age or older. The average household size was 2.74 and the average family size was 3.15.

In the CDP the population was spread out, with 29.9% under the age of 18, 6.2% from 18 to 24, 34.2% from 25 to 44, 23.0% from 45 to 64, and 6.7% who were 65 years of age or older. The median age was 35 years. For every 100 females, there were 104.3 males. For every 100 females age 18 and over, there were 101.0 males.

The median income for a household in the CDP was $50,040, and the median income for a family was $55,222. Males had a median income of $36,134 versus $30,881 for females. The per capita income for the CDP was $21,328. About 8.6% of families and 10.4% of the population were below the poverty line, including 14.2% of those under age 18 and 1.8% of those age 65 or over.

See also
 The Fairmont Orchid
 Paradise Run

References

External links

Census-designated places in Hawaii County, Hawaii
Populated places on Hawaii (island)